"Not the Glory" was an American television play broadcast on May 8, 1958, as part of the second season of the CBS television series Playhouse 90. David Shaw wrote the teleplay based on Pierre Boulle's first novel, William Conrad (1950). Robert Mulligan directed, and James Mason, Ann Todd, and Dennis King starred.

Plot
A Nazi spy, Wilhelm Konreid, travels to London in 1939, posing as a Polish patriot. He "ingratiates himself into high British government circles" and is offered a job with the BBC. Sir Wallace Goodfellow is  a British government official "whose intellect and cunning are pitted against" Konreid.

Cast
The following performers received screen credit for their performances:

 James Mason - Wilhelm Konreid
 Ann Todd - Lady Diane Goodfellow
 Dennis King - Sir Wallace Goodfellow
 Walter Fitzgerald - Major Wickham

References

1958 television plays
1958 American television episodes
Playhouse 90 (season 2) episodes